Submit is an EP by the British band Pitchshifter, released on 23 March 1992 by Earache on LP, cassette and CD.

French black metal band Blut aus Nord covered "Bastardiser" for their EP Debemur Morti.

Track listing

1995 re-release bonus tracks

Personnel

Pitchshifter
 J.S. Clayden – vocals, artwork
 M.D. Clayden – bass
 J.A. Carter – lead guitar, production
 S.E. Toolin – rhythm guitar

Technical personnel
 Dave Lawrence – engineering
 M. Akerman – photography

References

Pitchshifter albums
1992 EPs
Earache Records EPs